Rud-e Shur or Rood Shoor or Rud-i-Shur or Rud Shur or Rudshur may refer to:
 Rud-e Shur, Bushehr
 Rud-e Shur, Hormozgan
 Rudshur Rural District, in Markazi Province